Norvargodden is a headland and the northernmost point of the island Storøya in the Svalbard archipelago, east of Nordaustlandet. It is named after the vessel Norvarg.

See also
Polarstarodden
Sørodden

References

Headlands of Svalbard
Storøya